SCREEN FOREVER, formerly SPAA Conference, is an annual three-day conference for film industry professionals held in Australia by Screen Producers Australia.

History 
Screen Producers Australia (SPA) is a national organisation that unites the screen industry to campaign for a healthy commercial environment. Screen Producers Australia supports the interests of businesses in their production of feature films, television programs, interactive content and games across all genres and formats.

The Conference has been held in Sydney since 2009, having been previously held on the Gold Coast.

Description
SCREEN FOREVER is an annual three-day event organised by Screen Producers Australia. It is Australia's leading media and entertainment conference and the largest congregation of content creators, producers or anyone working in the screen industry who is seeking insight, inspiration, networking, professional development and fun.

Attendees at the SPAA Conference include key Australian and international industry practitioners involved in all aspects of producing, creating, distributing and financing screen content. In details, attendees encompass Film, television, documentary, formats, online and TV producers, broadcasters, post production experts, financiers, directors, writers, legal companies, government agencies, and distribution and acquisition executives.

The program offers a mix of interviews, pitching opportunities, panel discussions, workshops, and social events with opportunities for business development and networking.

2011 Conference 
The 26th annual SPAA Conference was held at the Hilton in Sydney from 13 to 16 November 2011

2010 Conference 
The 25th annual SPAA Conference was held at the Hilton in Sydney from 16 to 19 November 2010.

2009 Conference 
The 24th annual SPAA Conference was held at the Westin Hotel in Sydney from 17 to 20 November 2009.

2008 Conference 
The 23rd annual SPAA Conference was held at the Sheraton Mirage at the Gold Coast from 12 to 14 November 2008.

SPAA Conference Speakers 
Previous keynote speakers have included:

 Beau Willimon" House of Cards;
 George Lucas: Star Wars; 
 Matthew Weiner Mad Men; 
 Sydney Pollack: Talented Mr Ripley, Quiet American, Cold Mountain; 
 Robert Towne: Mission Impossible, Days of Thunder, The Firm; 
 Garreth Neame Downton Abbey; 
 Saul Zaentz: English Patient, Amadeus, One Flew Over Cuckoos Nest; 
 Eric Fellner: Fargo, Bridget Jones, Notting Hill, The Big Lebowski; 
 Lord David Puttnam: The Mission, The Killing Fields, Midnight Express; 
 Jon Plowman: Absolutely Fabulous, The Office, Vicar of Dibley; 
 Mike Reiss: Producer & Writer, The Simpsons; 
 Rene Balcer: Law & Order, Criminal Intent; 
 Cathy Schulman: Producer, Crash, The Station Agent;

SPAA Fringe 
SPAA Fringe was an annual two-day film television and new media event aimed at emerging producers presented until 2012 by the Screen Producers Association of Australia (SPAA).

References

External links
 

Communications and media organisations based in Australia
Australian film producers